The Chilean Cycling Federation (in Spanish: Federación Ciclista de Chile) is the national governing body of cycle racing in Chile.

It is a member of the UCI and COPACI.

See also
 Vuelta Ciclista Por Un Chile Lider

References

Cycle racing organizations
Cycle racing in Chile
Sports governing bodies in Chile